Peperomia teresitensis is a flowering plant from the genus Peperomia. Its native range is Peru.  Its only country that is native in is also Peru.

References

teresitensis
Flora of Peru
Taxa named by William Trelease